The England cricket team toured Australia in December 2021 and January 2022 to play five Tests, which formed The Ashes. In May 2021, Cricket Australia confirmed the fixtures for the tour. The Test series was also part of the 2021–2023 ICC World Test Championship. The England Lions also toured Australia during November and December 2021, before the majority of the team flew home before the second Test match.

Australia successfully retained the Ashes by winning the first three Test matches. The fourth Test ended in a draw, with Australia winning the fifth Test by 146 runs to win the series 4–0.

Squads

On 21 October 2021, the England and Wales Cricket Board (ECB) announced that Dom Sibley had withdrawn from the England Lions squad, with Harry Brook named as his replacement. Three days before the first match of the tour for the England Lions, Brydon Carse suffered a knee injury and was ruled out of the series. Alex Carey was added to Australia's Test squad for the Ashes as a replacement for Tim Paine, and was removed from the A squad.

Tour matches
Before the first Ashes Test match, England played a three-day match and a four-day match against England Lions. Australia were also scheduled to play a three-day intra-squad match, but the match was cancelled due to rain. As well as the Ashes Test matches, Australia A played the England Lions in a four-day match.

Test series

1st Test

2nd Test

3rd Test

4th Test

5th Test

Notes

References

External links
 Series home at ESPN Cricinfo

2021 in Australian cricket
2021 in English cricket
England 2021-22
International cricket competitions in 2021–22
2021-22
2021-22